Princess Eleonora Fugger von Babenhausen (October 4, 1864 in Bartenstein — March 1, 1945 in Vienna) was an Austrian noblewoman, socialite and chronicler of the House of Fugger. She is also known as Nora Fugger in her autobiography.

Early life 
Eleonore Aloysia Maria was born Princess zu Hohenlohe-Bartenstein, as the third child of Prince Carl zu Hohenlohe-Bartenstein (1837–1877) and his wife Princess Rosa Karoline née Countess von Sternberg (1836–1918). She had two elder siblings: Princess Marie (1861–1933) and Prince Johannes (1863–1921), who was married to Archduchess Anna Maria Theresia of Austria, a daughter of Ferdinand IV, Grand Duke of Tuscany and sister of Luise, Crown Princess of Saxony, in 1901.

Marriage and issue 
Eleonora married Karl, 5th Prince Fugger von Babenhausen (1861–1925) on January 8, 1887, in Vienna. Her husband was chamberlain to the Emperor Franz Joseph I of Austria.

Their children together:
 Countess Friederike (October 27, 1887 in Klagenfurt – July 4, 1949), who married Sir Adrian Carton de Wiart (1880–1959)
 Georg, 6th Prince Fugger von Babenhausen (1889–1934), who married Countess Elisabeth von Plessen (1891–1976)
 Countess Sylvia (May 8, 1892 in Enzersdorf – April 13, 1949), who married (then divorced in 1928) Count Friedrich zu Münster (1891–1942)
 Count Leopold (1893–1966), who married (then divorced in 1936) Countess Vera Czernin von und zu Chudenitz (1904–1959)
 Countess Maria Theresia (March 1, 1899 – June 28, 1994 in Munich), who married Prince Heinrich von Hanau und Horowitz (1900-1971)
 Countess Helene (June 21, 1908 – 1915 in Babenhausen)

Her memoirs are filled with stories about the upper classes of the Austro-Hungarian empire and are a testimony to that period of history.

Literature 
 Nora Fugger. The Glory of the Habsburgs: The memoirs of Princess Fugger. G.C. Harrap (1932) ASIN B00085SJMS

References

Eleonora
Eleonora
1945 deaths
1864 births
People from Schwäbisch Hall (district)